The Chehalis Western Trail is a rail trail in Washington. It occupies an abandoned railroad corridor that was once used by the historic Weyerhaeuser-owned Chehalis Western Railroad.  It has been converted to a bicycle and walking trail and intersects with the  Yelm-Rainier-Tenino Trail and the  Karen Fraser Woodland Trail.

Route
The trail begins at the Woodard Bay Natural Resources Conservation Area and runs mostly south to southeast towards its terminus at the intersection of the Yelm-Rainier-Tenino Trail. The trail passes through several cities and communities including, Olympia, South Bay, Lacey, East Olympia, and Skookumchuck.

Near the intersection with the Yelm-Rainier-Tenino Trail, the Chehalis Western Trail passes through the Monarch Contemporary Art Center and Sculpture Park.

References

External links
 
 Trail map

Rail trails in Washington (state)
Protected areas of Thurston County, Washington
Transportation in Thurston County, Washington